2010 in sports will describe the year's events in world sport.

Events by month

January
 24th-31st Bandy World Championship in Moscow, Russia. Winner:

February
7 American football,  Super Bowl XLIV. Winner:  New Orleans Saints.
12 – 28: Olympics, / 2010 Winter Olympics. Winner:  Canada.

March

April
 25: Marathon,  London Marathon. Winners:  Tsegaye Kebede,  Liliya Shobukhova

May
30: IndyCar Series, USA 2010 Indianapolis 500 Winner: Dario Franchitti

June
3 - 17: Basketball, / 2010 NBA Finals. Winner:  Los Angeles Lakers.
11–11 July: Association football,  2010 FIFA World Cup. Winner: .

July
The ashes

August
 28–12 September: Basketball,  2010 FIBA World Championship. Winner: .

September
 23–3 October: Basketball,  2010 FIBA World Championship for Women. Winner: .
 26: Formula One,  2010 Singapore Grand Prix. Winner:  Fernando Alonso.
 26: Marathon,  Berlin Marathon. Winners:  Patrick Makau,  Aberu Kebede.

October
 3 - 14: Multi-sport event,  2010 Commonwealth Games, Delhi, India. Winner: Australia
 10:  Marathon,  Chicago Marathon. Winners:  Samuel Wanjiru,  Liliya Shobukhova.
 24: Formula One,  2010 Korean Grand Prix. Winner:  Fernando Alonso.

November
 7: Marathon,  New York City Marathon. Winners:  Gebregziabher Gebremariam,  Edna Kiplagat.
 12 - 27: Multi-sport event,  2010 Asian Games, Guangzhou, China. Winner:  China

December

American football

January

 The Alabama Crimson Tide defeats the Texas Longhorns 37–21 in the BCS National Championship Game at the Rose Bowl, thereby claiming the 2009 National Championship in College Football.

February

 Super Bowl XLIV – the New Orleans Saints (NFC) won 31–17 over the Indianapolis Colts (AFC)
Location: Sun Life Stadium
Attendance: 74,059
MVP: Drew Brees, QB (New Orleans)
 For the third consecutive year, the proposed All American Football League, originally intended to launch in 2008, delays its planned debut, this time until 2011.

March

 Another proposed league, the United National Gridiron League, announces that it has indefinitely suspended operations.

April

 The new incarnation of the Arena Football League, consisting mostly of teams from the now-dissolved AF2, makes its debut. Although the new AFL is a separate corporate entity from the original AFL, it purchased the assets of the original league in a bankruptcy auction, enabling it to brand itself as a continuation of the original.

August

 August–September: New Meadowlands Stadium, the new home of the New York Giants and Jets, opened on August 16 with a pre-season game between the two teams, with the Jets as the designated home team. The Giants won this matchup 31–16. After winning a coin flip between the two teams, the Giants played the first regular-season game in the stadium on September 12, defeating the Carolina Panthers 31–18. The Jets played the Baltimore Ravens in their home opener the following night on Monday Night Football, losing 10–9.
 August 20 – The Spokane Shock defeat the Tampa Bay Storm 69–57 at home to win ArenaBowl XXIII.

September
 Reggie Bush, currently with the Saints, announced that he would forfeit his 2005 Heisman Trophy after his involvement with marketing agents while playing at USC led to severe NCAA penalties against the school. USC had already returned its copy of Bush's Heisman and the football program cut ties with Bush.

December

 Brett Favre, Quarterback of the Minnesota Vikings was listed inactive against the New York Giants, which was played at Ford Field home of the Detroit Lions after the Vikings stadium, the Hubert H. Humphrey Metrodome, collapsed due to heavy snow. This was the first time since 1991 that Favre did not start a game, ending his NFL consecutive-streak record at 297.

Aquatics

January/February
29 January–8 February Swimming at the 2010 South Asian Games in Dhaka, Bangladesh

July
13–18 2010 FINA Men's Water Polo World League (The Super Final was held in Niš, Serbia)
18–23 Swimming at the 2010 Central American and Caribbean Games in Mayaguez, Puerto Rico
27 July - 1 August 2010 FINA Men's Water Polo World Cup in Oradea, Romania

August
4–15 2010 European Aquatics Championships in Budapest, Hungary. The total aquatics medal table was won by Russia with 13 gold medals, 7 silver, 8 bronze. Germany was second in the total medal table with 8 gold, 9 silver, 3 bronze. France was third with 8 gold, 8 silver and 7 bronze. The swimming medal table had slightly different order. Russia was second, France first and Great Britain third. France got 8 gold medals, 7 silver, 6 bronze. Russia got 7 gold, 4 silver, 1 bronze. Great Britain got 6 gold, 6 silver and 6 bronze. Diving medal table was totally different: Germany was first, Ukraine second and Italy third. Germany got 5 gold, 3 silver, but no bronze. Ukraine got 2 gold, 2 silver and 0 bronze. Italy got 1 gold, two silver, but no bronze for Italy either.  Synchronized Swimming medal table had only three countries. Russia was first, Ukraine second and Spain third. Italy won the open water medal table, Greece was second and Germany third. Water Polo Championships were held separately. 
18-22 2010 Pan Pacific Swimming Championships in Irvine California, United States

September
13–29 2010 African Swimming Championships

October
4–13 Swimming, Diving and Synchronized Swimming at the 2010 Commonwealth Games in Delhi, India

November
12–27 Aquatics (Swimming, Diving, Water polo and Synchronized swimming) at the 2010 Asian Games in Guangzhou, China.
25–28 2010 European Short Course Swimming Championships in Eindhoven, Netherlands. Germany won the medal table with 10 gold, 8 silver, 4 bronze. Host country Netherlands was second with 9 gold, 8 silver and 5 bronze. Hungary was third with 6 gold, 1 silver and two bronze.

December
15-19 2010 FINA World Swimming Championships (25 m) in Dubai, United Arab Emirates. United States was the winner of the medal table with 12 golf medals, 6 silver and 7 bronze. Second in the medal table was Russia with 4 gold, 4 silver and 2 bronze medals. Spain was third with 4 gold medals, two silver and two bronze.

Association football

January

 10th—31st – Africa Cup of Nations, Angola. Winner – 
 Pachuca win the CONCACAF Champions League.
 PRK Hekari United win the OFC Champions League.
 Atlético Madrid win the UEFA Europa League.
 Internazionale win the UEFA Champions League.

June/July

 June 11 – July 11 – FIFA World Cup, South Africa. Winner –

July/August

 July 13 – August 1 – FIFA U-20 Women's World Cup, Germany.
Winner –  Germany

 Internacional win the Copa Libertadores

September 

 5th—25th – FIFA U-17 Women's World Cup, Trinidad and Tobago –  Korea Republic
 LDU Quito win the 2010 Recopa Sudamericana
 Seongnam Ilhwa win the AFC Champions League
 TP Mazembe win the CAF Champions League
 Internazionale  win the FIFA Club World Cup

Athletics

March
 12th–14th – IAAF World Indoor Championships in Doha, Qatar.
 27th –  IAAF World Cross Country Championships in Bydgoszcz, Poland.

May 

May 14 – August 27 –  IAAF Diamond League, worldwide track and field meeting series.
May 15–16 – IAAF World Race Walking Cup in Chihuahua, Mexico.

July/August 
July 27 – August 1 – European Athletics Championships in Barcelona, Spain.

October 

October 16 – IAAF World Half Marathon Championships in Nanning, China

Australian rules football

September 

Collingwood won the replay by 56 points on October 2, 16.12 (108) – 7.10 (52). It was the first drawn AFL Grand Final since 1977.

Bandy

 24–31 January Bandy World Championship in Moscow, Russia –  wins
 Bandy World Cup, October –  Dynamo Kazan wins

Baseball

April 

 2nd – Target Field in Minneapolis, the first stadium built specifically for the Minnesota Twins, opens with the Twins losing to the St. Louis Cardinals 8–4 in a spring training game.
 12th – Target Field hosts its first regular-season game, with the Twins defeating the Boston Red Sox 5–2.

May 

 9th – Dallas Braden of the Oakland Athletics pitches the 19th perfect game in Major League Baseball history in a 4–0 home win over the Tampa Bay Rays.
 29th – Roy Halladay of the Philadelphia Phillies pitches the 20th perfect game in MLB history in a 1–0 road win over the Florida Marlins. This marks the first time in the modern era that two perfect games have been thrown in the same MLB season.

June 

 2nd – Armando Galarraga of the Detroit Tigers loses out on a perfect game when the 27th batter, the Cleveland Indians' Jason Donald, is called safe on an infield grounder. Immediately after the game, umpire Jim Joyce admitted that he had blown the call. The Tigers won 3–0.

July 

 13th – The 81st Major League Baseball All-Star Game at Angel Stadium of Anaheim, Anaheim, California is won by the National League for the first time since 1996. Brian McCann, whose three-run double in the seventh inning gives the NL all of its runs in the 3–1 game, is named MVP.
George Steinbrenner owner of the New York Yankees dies of a heart attack at St. Joseph's Hospital in Tampa Bay, Florida.

September 

 September 7 – Trevor Hoffman, closing pitcher for the Milwaukee Brewers become the first closing pitcher in the history of the MLB to record 600 career saves, at Miller Park in Milwaukee, Wisconsin against the St. Louis Cardinals.

October 

 6th – In Game 1 of the National League Division Series, Halladay no-hits the Cincinnati Reds in the Phillies' 4–0 win. Halladay becomes only the second pitcher to throw a no-hitter in postseason play, after Don Larsen's perfect game in Game 5 of the 1956 World Series.
 22nd – The Texas Rangers defeat the New York Yankees in the ALCS to advance to their first World Series.
 23rd – The San Francisco Giants defeat the Philadelphia Phillies in the NLCS to advance to their fourth World Series since relocating to San Francisco.

November 

 1st – The San Francisco Giants defeat the Texas Rangers to win the 2010 World Series 4–1.
 7th – The Chiba Lotte Marines defeat the Chunichi Dragons to win the 2010 Japan Series 4–2–1.

December 

 2nd – Ron Santo former 3rd baseman of the Chicago Cubs dies due to complications from bladder cancer and diabetes in a Scottsdale, Arizona hospital.
 Legendary Milwaukee Brewers baseball announcer and former Milwaukee Braves catcher Bob Uecker, who played on the Braves during the 1957 World Series in which the Braves won, undergoes two successful heart surgeries, one during the baseball season, and one following it, and gets inducted into the WWE Hall of Fame.
 The Milwaukee Brewers reveal a statue in honor of Baseball Commissioner Allen H. "Bud" Selig a native of Milwaukee, Wisconsin and who helped bring the Brewers to Milwaukee (formerly the Seattle Pilots) after the departure of the 1957 World Series champions, Milwaukee Braves.

Basketball

February 

 14th – A crowd of 108,713, the largest in the sport's history, packs Cowboys Stadium in Arlington, Texas for the 2010 NBA All-Star Game. The East defeats the West 141–139, with the Miami Heat's Dwyane Wade, representing the East, being named MVP.
 NCAA men's tournament — Duke defeats Butler 61–59 at Lucas Oil Stadium, 6 miles (9.7 km) from Butler's campus in Indianapolis. It is the fourth national title for both Duke and its head coach Mike Krzyzewski. Duke's Kyle Singler is named Most Outstanding Player.
 NCAA women's tournament — Connecticut completes their second consecutive 39–0 season with a 53–47 win over Stanford at the Alamodome in San Antonio. It is the seventh national title and fourth unbeaten season for both the Huskies and their head coach Geno Auriemma. The Most Outstanding Player award goes to UConn's Maya Moore.
 Euroleague — Regal FC Barcelona wins the title in Paris.

June 

 NBA Finals — The Los Angeles Lakers defeat the Boston Celtics in seven games for the Lakers' 16th NBA title.

August/September 

 August 28 – September 12 – 2010 FIBA World Championship in Turkey —       . MVP: Kevin Durant (USA)
 September 23 – October 3- 2010 FIBA World Championship for Women in the Czech Republic —       . MVP: Hana Horáková (Czech Republic).

December 

 21st — The University of Connecticut women's team wins its 89th consecutive game, surpassing the NCAA Division I record previously held by the UCLA men's team of 1971–1974.
 30th – UConn's record winning streak ends at 90 when the Huskies lose 71–59 to Stanford.

Boxing

 March 13 – Manny Pacquiao defeats Joshua Clottey by controlling the fight from start to finish, leading to Pacquiao winning by a unanimous decision. The fight was the first boxing match held at Cowboys Stadium in Arlington, Texas in front of over 41,000 people. This was Pacquiao's first defense of his newly awarded WBO welterweight title.
 March 20 – Wladimir Klitschko knocks out Eddie Chambers with a fierce left that hits Chambers in the temple with only five seconds left in the fight. The punch knocked Chambers out nearly instantly, with him collapsing to the canvas and hanging off the last rope. This was Klitschko's first defense of his Ring magazine heavyweight title, his fourth defense of his WBO heavyweight title, and his eighth defense of his IBF and IBO heavyweight titles.
 March 27 – Pongsaklek Wonjongkam defeats Kōki Kameda by a majority decision to win the WBC flyweight title and vacant Ring magazine flyweight title. This is the second time Wonjongkam has become the WBC flyweight champion, after first winning the title in March 2001. Wonjongkam defended the title seventeen times, until he lost to Daisuke Naito in July 2007. This fight is later named the best flyweight fight of 2010 by Ring magazine.
 April 17 – Kelly Pavlik loses to Sergio Martínez in a close fight for Pavlik's WBC, WBO, and Ring magazine middleweight titles. Martínez controlled the early rounds with quick in and out movements, refusing to heavily engage with Pavlik. Martínez managed to cut Pavlik's left eyebrow in the first round. Pavlik then started to mount a comeback in the middle rounds by blocking Martínez's punches more effectively. Pavlik spent most of his time headhunting trying to land a hard right, which did help Pavlik get a knockdown in the seventh round. In the late rounds Martínez came back and started to open up Pavlik's cuts more, making his face extremely blood. In the post fight interview Pavlik said he couldn't see due to the blood. Martínez ended up winning the fight with a unanimous decision.
 April 24 – Mikkel Kessler upsets Carl Froch by a unanimous decision to win Froch's WBC super middleweight title. The fight was part of the second-group stage of the Super Six World Boxing Classic. Following the fight, Froch complained about a judging bias, seeing how the fight was held in Kessler's country of origin, Denmark. This fight was later named the best super middleweight fight of 2010 by Ring magazine.
 April 30 – In a stunning upset, Fernando Montiel knocksout Hozumi Hasegawa ending his five-year, 10 title defense streak and taking his WBC bantamweight title. The knockout came as a surprise due to Hasegawa seeming to be clearly leading until the end of the fourth, when Montiel landed a left punch that stunned Hasegawa and pushed him back to the ropes, where he unloaded on him until the referee stopped the fight.
 May 1 – Floyd Mayweather Jr. defeats Shane Mosley to continue his undefeated career streak. Mosley came out strong for the first two rounds—at one point making Mayweather's knees buckle—but Mayweather went on to control the fight.
 May 8 – Making his comeback after roughly 15½ months of being suspended, Antonio Margarito defeated Roberto Garcia to win the vacant WBC international super welterweight title.
 May 15 – Amir Khan dominates Paul Malignaggi to win by TKO in the eleventh round to retain his WBA light welterweight title for the second time. This was Khan's debut in the United States.
 May 22 – In their fourth fight against each other Rafael Márquez evens the series to two wins for each man by stopping Israel Vázquez by TKO in the third round.
 June 5 – Miguel Cotto defeats Yuri Foreman by a ninth round stoppage due to a leg injury Foreman suffered during the fight. In an amazing display of will, Foreman refused to quit despite being in what he later called a "very sharp pain". A towel was thrown in the ring, but it was ruled to have come from an outside source, and the fight continued for another minute until being stopped officially. This was Cotto's debut at light middleweight. The fight was the first boxing match in the new Yankee stadium built in 2009, and the first match in either Yankee stadium since Ali/Norton 3 in 1976.
 July 31 – In a rematch of 2009's fight of the year, Juan Manuel Márquez defeats Juan Díaz for a second time to retain his WBO lightweight title and to win the WBA super world lightweight title.
 August 14 – Jean Pascal upsets Chad Dawson by a technical decision due to an accidental headbutt that caused a major cut over Dawson's right eye and the fight was stopped by the ringside doctor. However Pascal easily won the fight according to the judge's scorecards. Pascal defended his WBC light heavyweight title for the third time, won Dawson's IBO light heavyweight title, and filled the vacant Ring magazine light heavyweight title.
 August 28 – Giovanni Segura upsets Iván Calderón by a knockout in the eighth round to win the WBO and WBA super world light flyweight titles. Segura ends Calderón's undefeated 34-fight winning record. This fight would later be named both the best light flyweight and overall fight of the year of 2010 by Ring magazine.
 September 11 – Yuriorkis Gamboa defeats Orlando Salido to unified the  WBA world and vacant IBF featherweight titles. Gamboa was knocked down in the eighth round and was docked two points in the twelfth round. While Salido was knocked down twice in the twelfth round.
 November 6 – Juan Manuel López defeats Rafael Márquez by TKO, in an exciting fight that was stopped early due to Márquez suffering a shoulder injury following the eighth round. López defends his WBO featherweight title and improves his record to 30–0. This fight is later named the best featherweight fight of 2010 by Ring magazine.
 November 13 – Manny Pacquiao destroys Antonio Margarito to the WBC super welterweight title, making Pacquiao the first and so far only boxer to win world titles in eight different weight classes. Following the fight, Margarito is sent to a hospital with a fractured orbital bone, which requires surgery. This was Margarito's first major fight in over 21 months, following a knockout loss to Shane Mosley in January 2009.
 November 20 – In a highly anticipated rematch, Sergio Martínez knocks out Paul Williams in the second round to retain his WBC and Ring magazine middleweight titles. This fight was later named knockout of the year by Ring magazine.
 November 27 – Juan Manuel Márquez defeats Michael Katsidis by ninth-round TKO. Katsidis was competitive throughout the fight and even scored a knockdown on Márquez in the third round. While Márquez fought a more solid fight, landing many combinations. Márquez defends his WBO, WBA, and Ring magazine lightweight titles. This fight is later named the best lightweight fight of 2010 by Ring magazine.
 December 11 – Amir Khan defeats Marcos Maidana in a relatively close decision. Khan came out strong in the early part of the fight, by applying heavy pressure on Maidana and getting a knockdown late in the first round. However, in the later parts of the fight Khan spent much of his time avoiding Maidana trying to endure through rounds. At one point Maidana appeared to have almost finished Khan in the tenth round, when he landed a huge punch. However Khan absorbed the punishment and did enough in the early rounds to win by a unanimous decision. Khan defended his WBA world light welterweight title for the third time. This fight is later named the best light welterweight fight of 2010 by Ring magazine.
 December 11 – Abner Mares defeats Vic Darchinyan by a spit decision, to start Showtime's second boxing tournament based on the Super Six World Boxing Classic. However instead featured only four fighters, a single elimination format, and was focused on the bantamweight division at 118 lbs (54 kg) under the title, The Bantamweight Tournament: Winner Takes All. This fight was later named the best bantamweight fight of 2010 by Ring magazine.
 December 18 – After twelve rounds of boxing, Bernard Hopkins vs. Jean Pascal ends in a controversial majority draw.

Canadian football
 November 28 – 98th Grey Cup is held at Commonwealth Stadium in Edmonton — Montreal Alouettes defeat Saskatchewan Roughriders 21–18.

Cricket

January 15–30 — 2010 U-19 Cricket World Cup, New Zealand
April 30,  – May 16, — 2010 ICC World Twenty20, West Indies
June 15–24 — 2010 Asia Cup, Sri Lanka
September 10–26 — 2010 Champions League Twenty20, South Africa
November 25, 2010 – January 7, 2011 — 2010–11 Ashes series, Australia

Curling

Cycling

March 20 Milan–San Remo Óscar Freire wins first monument of the year over Tom Boonen in predicted sprint finish.
April 4 Tour of Flanders Fabian Cancellara defeats home favourite Tom Boonen as 1 million people line the streets of Northern Belgium for the Unesco heritage race, famous for its culture, beautiful forests and brutal cobbled hills. Cancellara attacked first on the Molenberg with 44 km to go and Boonen was the only one who could follow. With 15 km to go Cancellara launched a powerful attack on the Muur-Kapelmuur using the last metres of the hill and descent to create a big gap. Once the gap was created, the world tt champion was always favourite and had time to celebrate.
April 11 Paris–Roubaix Fabian Cancellara launched a surprising attack with over 45 km to go while Boonen was taking a drink behind. The Swiss, nicknamed Spartacus, showed incredible strength to stretch out the gap to over 4 minutes over the rest, before relaxing in the final kilometres to celebrate becoming one of the few people to achieve the Flanders Roubaix double in the same week.
April 24 Liège–Bastogne–Liège Alexander Vinokourov came out victorious over Alexander Kolobnev with whom he worked to set up a 2-man finish. Vino attacked with 15 km to go, with many teams hesitant to bring him back, as drag Vinos teammate Alberto Contador, would then attack. With 9 km to go an elite group behind formed and home favourite Philippe Gilbert launched an all or nothing attack. Gilbert halved the 40 second deficit, but Vino and Kolobnev used their 2-man advantage to tire him out and ultimately contested the finish among themselves with Vino riding away to celebrate a successful comeback at the age of 36.
May 8–30 Giro d'Italia Ivan Basso won what was considered to be one of the greatest  Grand Tours of all time. With surprisingly exciting stages in the first week, including crashes in the Netherlands a ttt and a tough stage through the mud of Strade Bianchi, the race was blown apart on stage 12 when a group of 30 riders, including climbers David Arroyo and Carlos Sastre got a 12-minute lead. This forced the other contenders to push hard in the very difficult mountains of the 3rd week. Cadel Evans Michelle Scarponi Vincenzo Nibali and Basso took minutes over the leaders on 3 mountain stages, one of which was a mountain finish on the Monte Zoncolan, the hardest mountain in Grand Tour history, lined by hundreds of thousands of fans. The race came down to a difficult stage over the extremely difficult Passo di Mortirolo with a finish in Aprica. Basso needed 3 minutes to take the jersey from Arroyo, and looked likely to get it after taking 2 minutes on the ascent of the climb. But Arroyo surprised the world of cycling with an amazing descent of the mountain in very dangerous conditions, taking back 1 minute 30. The final twist came with the final climb into Aprica, were Basso, helped by teammate Nibali, and stage winner Scarponi, was able to take 3 minutes on Arroyo, gaining the jersey and a 2nd Giro win.
July 3–25 Tour de France Alberto Contador won his 3rd Tour de France and 5th Grand Tour after a close duel with young Luxembourger Andy Schleck. The two were always comfortable, and close to each other, but the onus was on Schleck who was considered to be a far weaker time trial cyclist. Going into the stage on the Col du Tourmalet Schleck needed to get a gap over Contador, but, although he won the stage, Contador finished just behind Schleck and won the Tour on the time trial two days later.
August 1–7 Tour de Pologne Dan Martin
August 28–19 Vuelta a España Vincenzo Nibali won his first Grand Tour after putting in a surprisingly strong performance on the decisive stage. The strong favourite at the halfway point had been Igor Antón but the  rider had an unfortunate crash and was forced to abandon. This left the Italian to fight it out with Galician climber Ezequiel Mosquera. Mosquera got time in several mountain stages, and needed 40 seconds on the final stage over the very steep Bola del Mundo. Huge crowds cheered on Mosquera as he attacked with 3 km and he was able to initially get 20 seconds. But Nibali came back and caught Mosquera in the last few metres, and though he was unable to overtake the Spaniard for the stage win, he was the overall winner.
September 29–October 3 UCI Road World Championships Women's Time trial – Emma Pooley. Men's Time Trial – Fabian Cancellara. Women's Road Race – Giorgia Bronzini. Men's Road Race – Thor Hushovd won an epic race which looked to finish in anything but a sprint finish, until the last few kilometres. Several groups kept forming in attacks that looked likely to succeed, but ultimately always got brought back. Favourite Philippe Gilbert expected attack finally came on the 1st climb of the last lap. But as he was caught by a 2nd group, the peloton surprisingly appeared just behind them with 3 k to go and a sprint finish it turned out to be.
October 17 Giro di Lombardia – Philippe Gilbert made up for his failure at the worlds with a 2nd victory in the final monument of the season. The Belgian was simply too strong throughout and never looked like losing. After a crash took out Nibali, Gilbert was left on his own, and waited for Michele Scarponi for support. But the Italian, who is superior in Grand Tours, was out of his depth contesting a one-day race against the classic specialist, who waltzed away with ease in the last few kilometres.

Equestrian
 February 18 – February 28 – 2010 Arctic Equestrian Games, Norway
 September 25 – October 10 – 2010 FEI World Equestrian Games, Lexington, Kentucky

Figure skating

Floorball
 Men's World Floorball Championships
 Champion: 
 Women's under-19 World Floorball Championships
 Champion: 
 EuroFloorball Cup
 Men's champion:  Storvreta IBK
 Women's champion:  IKSU Innebandy

Futsal
 UEFA Futsal Championship, Hungary – Spain
 2010 Grand Prix de Futsal, Brazil – Brazil

Golf

April 20 - Lorena Ochoa announced her retirement from professional golf, leaving her 4-year streak as world's number one ranked player.

Major championships
The Masters winner: Phil Mickelson
U.S. Open winner: Graeme McDowell
The Open Championship winner: Louis Oosthuizen
PGA Championship winner: Martin Kaymer

Women's major championships
Kraft Nabisco Championship winner: Yani Tseng
LPGA Championship winner: Cristie Kerr
U.S. Women's Open winner: Paula Creamer
Women's British Open winner: Yani Tseng

Senior major championships
Senior PGA Championship winner: Tom Lehman
Senior British Open winner: Bernhard Langer
U.S. Senior Open winner: Bernhard Langer
The Tradition winner: Fred Funk
Senior Players Championship winner: Mark O'Meara

Gymnastics
 2010 European Men's Artistic Gymnastics Championships
 2010 European Women's Artistic Gymnastics Championships
 2010 Rhythmic Gymnastics European Championships
 2010 World Artistic Gymnastics Championships
 2010 World Rhythmic Gymnastics Championships

Handball
 European Men's Handball Championship – France

Horse racing
Steeplechases
 Cheltenham Gold Cup – Imperial Commander
 Grand National – Don't Push It
 Grand Steeple-Chase de Paris – Polar Rochelais
 Nakayama Grand Jump – Merci Mont Saint
Flat races
 Australia:
 Cox Plate – So You Think
 Melbourne Cup – Americain
 Canadian Triple Crown:
 Queen's Plate – Big Red Mike
 Prince of Wales Stakes – Golden Moka
 Breeders' Stakes – Miami Deco
 Dubai, United Arab Emirates: Dubai World Cup – Glória de Campeão
 France: Prix de l'Arc de Triomphe – Workforce
 Hong Kong: Hong Kong International Races
 Hong Kong Vase – Mastery
 Hong Kong Sprint – J J the Jet Plane
 Hong Kong Mile – Beauty Flash
 Hong Kong Cup – Snow Fairy
 Ireland: Irish Derby – Cape Blanco
 Japan: Japan Cup – Rose Kingdom
 English Triple Crown:
 2,000 Guineas Stakes – Makfi
 The Derby – Workforce
 St. Leger Stakes – Arctic Cosmos
 United States Triple Crown:
 Kentucky Derby – Super Saver
 Preakness Stakes – Lookin at Lucky
 Belmont Stakes – Drosselmeyer
 Breeders' Cup World Thoroughbred Championships at Churchill Downs, Louisville, Kentucky (both days arranged in race card order):
 Day 1:
 Breeders' Cup Marathon – Eldaafer
 Breeders' Cup Juvenile Fillies Turf – More Than Real
 Breeders' Cup Filly & Mare Sprint – Dubai Majesty
 Breeders' Cup Juvenile Fillies – Awesome Feather
 Breeders' Cup Filly & Mare Turf – Shared Account
 Breeders' Cup Ladies' Classic – Unrivaled Belle
 Day 2:
 Breeders' Cup Juvenile Turf – Pluck
 Breeders' Cup Sprint – Big Drama
 Breeders' Cup Turf Sprint – Chamberlain Bridge
 Breeders' Cup Juvenile – Uncle Mo
 Breeders' Cup Mile – Goldikova
 Breeders' Cup Dirt Mile – Dakota Phone
 Breeders' Cup Turf – Dangerous Midge
 Breeders' Cup Classic – Blame
 Harness 
 Prix d'Amérique – Oyonnax

Ice hockey

 February 13–25:  wins gold,  wins silver, and  wins bronze at the women's tournament of the 2010 Winter Olympics in Vancouver, British Columbia, Canada
 February 16–28:  wins gold,  wins silver, and  wins bronze at the men's tournament of the 2010 Winter Olympics in Vancouver, British Columbia, Canada.
 May 7–23:  wins gold,  wins silver, and  wins bronze at the 2010 IIHF World Championship in Cologne, Mannheim and Gelsenkirchen, Germany.
 June 9: The Chicago Blackhawks defeat the Philadelphia Flyers 4–3 in overtime of game six of the 2010 Stanley Cup Final series to win the Stanley Cup for the first time in 49 years.

Lacrosse
 July 15–24 – 2010 World Lacrosse Championship, Manchester, England.

Mixed martial arts
The following is a list of major noteworthy MMA events by month.

January

1/2 – UFC 108: Evans vs. Silva

1/10 – WEC 46: Varner vs. Henderson

1/11 – UFC Fight Night: Maynard vs. Diaz

1/30 – Strikeforce: Miami

February

2/6 – UFC 109: Relentless

2/21 – UFC 110: Nogueira vs. Velasquez

2/26 – ShoMMA 6: Kaufman vs. Hashi

March

3/6 – WEC 47: Bowles vs. Cruz

3/21 – UFC Live: Vera vs. Jones

3/22 – Dream 13

3/26 – ShoMMA 7: Johnson vs. Mahe

3/27 – UFC 111: St. Pierre vs. Hardy

3/31 – UFC Fight Night: Florian vs. Gomi

April

4/8 – Bellator XIII

4/10 – UFC 112: Invincible

4/15 – Bellator XIV

4/17 – Strikeforce: Nashville

4/22 – Bellator XV

4/24 – WEC 48: Aldo vs. Faber

4/25 – ASTRA

4/29 – Bellator XVI

May

5/6 – Bellator XVII

5/8 – UFC 113: Machida vs. Shogun 2

5/13 – Bellator XVIII

5/15 – Strikeforce: Heavy Artillery

5/20 – Bellator XIX

5/21 – ShoMMA 8: Lindland vs. Casey

5/27 – Bellator XX

5/29 – UFC 114: Rampage vs. Evans

5/29 – Dream 14

June

6/10 – Bellator XXI

6/12 – UFC 115: Liddell vs. Franklin

6/16 – Strikeforce: Los Angeles

6/17 – Bellator XXII

6/19 – The Ultimate Fighter 11 Finale

6/20 – WEC 49: Varner vs. Shalorus

6/24 – Bellator XXIII

6/26 – Strikeforce: Fedor vs. Werdum

July

7/3 – UFC 116: Lesnar vs. Carwin

7/10 – Dream 15

7/10 – Impact FC 1 – The Uprising: Brisbane

7/18 – Impact FC 2 – The Uprising: Sydney

7/23 – ShoMMA 9: Rosario vs. Mahe

August

8/1 – UFC Live: Jones vs. Matyushenko

8/7 – UFC 117: Silva vs. Sonnen

8/12 – Bellator XXIV

8/13 – ShoMMA 10: Riggs vs. Taylor

8/18 – WEC 50: Cruz vs. Benavidez 2

8/19 – Bellator XXV

8/21 – Strikeforce: Houston

8/26 – Bellator XXVI

8/28 – UFC 118: Edgar vs. Penn 2

September

9/2 – Bellator XXVII

9/9 – Bellator XXVIII

9/11 – Shark Fights 13: Jardine vs. Prangley

9/15 – UFC Fight Night: Marquardt vs. Palhares

9/16 – Bellator XXIX

9/23 – Bellator XXX

9/25 – UFC 119: Mir vs. Cro Cop

9/25 – Dream 16

9/30 – Bellator XXXI

9/30 – WEC 51: Aldo vs. Gamburyan

October

10/9 – Strikeforce: Diaz vs. Noons II

10/14 – Bellator XXXII

10/16 – UFC 120: Bisping vs. Akiyama

10/21 – Bellator XXXIII

10/22 – ShoMMA 11: Bowling vs. Voelker

10/23 – UFC 121: Lesnar vs. Velasquez

10/28 – Bellator XXXIV

November

11/9 – Israel FC: Genesis

11/11 – WEC 52: Faber vs. Mizugaki

11/13 – UFC 122: Marquardt vs. Okami

11/19 – ShoMMA 12: Wilcox vs. Ribeiro

11/20 – UFC 123: Rampage vs. Machida

December

12/4 – The Ultimate Fighter 12 Finale aka The Ultimate Fighter: Team GSP vs. Team Koscheck Finale

12/4 – Strikeforce: St. Louis aka Strikeforce: Henderson vs. Babalu II

12/11 – UFC 124: St-Pierre vs. Koscheck 2

12/16 – WEC 53: Henderson vs. Pettis

12/31 – Dynamite!! 2010

Motorsport

Multi-sport events
 January 25 – January 31 – 2010 World Winter Masters Games, Bled, Slovenia
 January 29 – February 8 – 2010 South Asian Games, Dhaka, Bangladesh
 February 12 – 28 – 2010 Winter Olympics, Vancouver, British Columbia, Canada
 March 6 – 13 – 2010 Arctic Winter Games in Grande Prairie, Alberta, Canada
 March 12 – 21 – 2010 Winter Paralympics, Vancouver, British Columbia, Canada
 March 19 – 30 – 2010 South American Games, in Medellin, Colombia
 July 17 – August 1 – 2010 Central American and Caribbean Games, Mayagüez, Puerto Rico
 July 31 to August 6, 2010 - 2010 Gay Games, Cologne, Germany
 August 14 – 26 – 2010 Summer Youth Olympics, Singapore, Singapore
 October 3 – 14 – 2010 Commonwealth Games, Delhi, India
 November 12 – 27 – 2010 Asian Games, Guangzhou, China
 December 12 – 19 – 2010 Asian Para Games, Guangzhou, China

Pickleball
 The International Federation of Pickleball was founded in Goodyear, Arizona by the USA Pickleball Association, now USA Pickleball.

Rink hockey
January 9 – January 15: 2010 Asian Roller Hockey Championship, Dalian, China
July: 2010 Rink Hockey European Championship, Wuppertal, Germany
September 25 – October 2: 2010 Rink Hockey Ladies World Championship, Alcobendas, Spain
September 23 – October 30: 2010 Rink Hockey Men's B World Championship, Dornbirn, Austria
2010 Rink Hockey American Championship, Catalonia

Rowing
 October 29 – November 7 – 2010 World Rowing Championships will be held at Lake Karapiro, Hamilton, New Zealand.

Rugby league

January 29 – October 2 – Super League XV was held in England, Wales and France. Wigan Warriors defeated St. Helens 22–10 in the Grand Final for their second title. This was also St Helens' fourth consecutive Grand Final defeat.
February 13– 2010 All Stars match is played on the Gold Coast, Australia.
February 28– 2010 World Club Challenge is played in Leeds, England, with Australia's Melbourne Storm beating England's Leeds Rhinos.
March 12 – October 3 – 2010 NRL season was held in Australia and New Zealand. The St. George Illawarra Dragons defeated Sydney Roosters 32–8 in the Grand Final for their first premiership since the 1999 merger that created the team.
April 22 – The Melbourne Storm Storm are stripped of their 2007 and 2009 premierships and 2006–2008 minor premierships, fined $1.689 million, deducted all eight premiership points for the 2010 season and barred from receiving premiership points for the rest of the season by the National Rugby League after being found guilty of long-term gross salary cap breaches.
October–November – 2010 Rugby League Four Nations will be held in Australia and New Zealand.
October–November – 2010 European Cup will be held in Europe where Ireland, Scotland, Wales and France will compete for a spot in the 2011 four nations.

Rugby union

 116th Six Nations Championship series is won by  who complete the Grand Slam.
 March 8 – The Celtic League and Italian Rugby Federation confirm the entry of two Italian teams, Aironi and Benetton Treviso, into the previously Celtic competition in 2010–11.
 May 22 – Toulouse win their fourth Heineken Cup, defeating fellow French side Biarritz 21–19 in the Heineken Cup Final at Stade de France in Saint-Denis.
 May 23 – Cardiff Blues win the Amlin Challenge Cup Final at Stade Vélodrome in Marseille 28–21 over nearby French club Toulon.
 May 29 – The last Super 14 Final before the competition expands to 15 teams is won by the Bulls, who defeat fellow South African side Stormers 25–17 at Orlando Stadium in Soweto.
 May 30 –  win the Edinburgh Sevens and secure their first IRB Sevens World Series season crown.
 May 30,  – June 26, – The 2010 Summer Tours start.
 October 23,  – December 18, – The 2010 end-of-year series takes place. Notable events during this series include:
November 13: Victor Matfield earned his 103rd cap to become South Africa's most-capped player ever.
November 20: Richie McCaw and Mils Muliaina earned their 93rd caps, becoming New Zealand's most-capped players.
November 27: The 2011 Rugby World Cup qualification process concluded in Bucharest with Romania defeating Uruguay 39–12. Romania won the two-legged tie 60–33 on aggregate to claim the final spot in the 2011 Rugby World Cup.
November 27: Dan Carter of New Zealand surpassed Jonny Wilkinson of England as the leading career point scorer in Test rugby.

Domestic competitions
  Guinness Premiership – Leicester Tigers
  Top 14 – Clermont win their first title in their nearly 100-year history after having lost in 10 previous championship finals.
    Celtic League – Ospreys
   LV= Cup (Anglo-Welsh Cup) – Northampton Saints
  ITM Cup (formerly Air New Zealand Cup) – Canterbury
  Currie Cup –

Ski mountaineering
 March 1 – March 6 – 2010 World Championship of Ski Mountaineering in Gran Valira (Pyrenees), Andorra

Tennis

Australian Open
Men's final: Roger Federer defeats Andy Murray, 6–3, 6–4, 7–6(11)
 Women's final: Serena Williams defeats Justine Henin, 6–4, 3–6, 6–2
French Open
Men's final: Rafael Nadal defeats Robin Söderling, 6–4, 6–2, 6–4
Women's final: Francesca Schiavone defeats Samantha Stosur, 6–4, 7–6(2)
Francesca Schiavone becomes the first Italian, male or female, to win a Grand Slam singles title.
Wimbledon Championships
Men's final: Rafael Nadal defeats Tomáš Berdych, 6–3, 7–5, 6–4
Women's final: Serena Williams defeats Vera Zvonareva, 6–3, 6–2
The first round of the Gentlemen's Singles features the longest match in tennis history. In a match that lasted 11 hours, 5 minutes over three days, American John Isner defeats France's Nicolas Mahut 6–4, 3–6, 6–7(7), 7–6(3), 70–68. The final set alone was longer in both games and time than the previous longest match.
U.S. Open
Men's final: Rafael Nadal defeats Novak Djokovic, 6–4, 5–7, 6–4, 6–2
Women's final: Kim Clijsters defeats Vera Zvonareva, 6–2, 6–1
Davis Cup
  defeats , 3–2
Fed Cup
  defeats , 3–1

Volleyball
 Women's CEV Champions League 2009–10 December 1, 2009 – April 4, 2010. Final Four in Cannes, France
 Champions   Volley Bergamo,   Fenerbahçe Acıbadem,   RC Cannes. MVP: 
 Men's CEV Champions League 2009–10 December 1, 2009 – May 2, 2010. Final Four in Łódź, Poland.
 Champions   Trentino BetClic,   Dynamo Moscow,   PGE Skra Bełchatów. MVP: 
 2010 Liga de Voleibol Superior Femenino February 12 – May 12, in Puerto Rico
 Champions  Pinkin de Corozal, Season MVP: , Final Series MVP: 
2010 Men's Pan-American Volleyball Cup, May 20–31, in Puerto Rico
MVP: 
2010 Montreux Volley Masters, June 8–13, in Montreux, Switzerland
MVP: 
2010 Women's European Volleyball League, June 5 – July 25, Final Four in Ankara, Turkey
MVP: 
2010 Men's European Volleyball League, June 4 – July 17, Final Four in Guadalajara, Spain
MVP: 
FIVB World League 2010, June 11 – July 25, 2010, in Córdoba, Argentina
MVP: 
2010 Women's Pan-American Volleyball Cup, June 16–27, in Rosarito and Tijuana, Mexico
MVP: 
Men's Volleyball at the 2010 Central American and Caribbean Games, July 24–29, in Mayagüez, Puerto Rico
MVP: 
Women's Volleyball at the 2010 Central American and Caribbean Games, July 18–23, in Mayagüez, Puerto Rico
MVP: 
FIVB World Grand Prix 2010 August 6–29, Final Round in Ningbo, China
MVP: 
2010 Final Four Women's Volleyball Cup, September 19–26, Chiapas, Mexico
MVP: 
2010 FIVB Men's World Championship, September 24, 2010 to October 10, 2010
MVP: 
2010 FIVB Women's World Championship October 29, 2010 to November 14, 2010
MVP: 
Men's Volleyball at the 2010 Asian Games, November 18–27 in Guangzhou, Guangdong, China
Women's Volleyball at the 2010 Asian Games, November 13–27 in Guangzhou, Guangdong, China
 2010 FIVB Men's Club World Championship December 15–21, 2010 in Doha, Qatar.
 Champions   Trentino BetClic,   PGE Skra Bełchatów,   Paykan Tehran, MVP: 
 2010 FIVB Women's Club World Championship December 15–21, 2010 in Doha, Qatar.
 Champions   Fenerbahçe Acıbadem,   Sollys Osasco,   Bergamo, MVP:

References

 
Sports by year